Daihiniodes hastifera, the Arizona sand-treader cricket, is a species of camel cricket in the family Rhaphidophoridae. It is found in North America.

References

Rhaphidophoridae
Articles created by Qbugbot
Insects described in 1904